The Adams is a traditional dry fly primarily used for trout.  It is considered a general imitation of an adult mayfly, flying caddis or midge. It was designed by Leonard Halladay from Mayfield, Michigan in 1922, at the request of his friend Charles Adams. The Adams has been considered one of the most popular, versatile, effective and best selling dry flies since its creation.

Origin
In 1922, Leonard Halladay, a Michigan fly tyer conceived the Adams as a general mayfly imitation.  It was first fished by an Ohio attorney and friend of Halladay, Charles F. Adams on the Boardman River near Traverse City, Michigan.  Charles Adams reported his success with the fly to Halladay, who named the fly after his friend. The small community of Mayfield, Michigan, bids itself as the "Birthplace of the Adams Fly".

Materials
 Hook-dry fly hook (size 10-22)
 Thread-flat waxed nylon thread
 Hackle-dry fly hackles
 Tail-hackle fibers grizzly
 Abdomen-super fine dubbing
 Wing-grizzly hackle tips

Variations

The Adams has been tied with a variety of materials and variations.  The most common variation is the Parachute Adams where the hackle is tied parachute style around a wing base of white calf hair.  The variation gives the fly greater buoyancy and visibility in rough water.  Other variations include spentwings, downwings, females tied with a yellow body tag resembling an egg sac, hairwings, and with different tailing material such as elk, deer or moose.

Notes

Further reading
 The Orvis Fly-fishing Guide by Tom Rosenbauer ; photographs by Tom Rosenbauer & the Orvis Company ; illustrations by Bob White. Guilford, Conn. : Lyons Press, (c2007) 
  ″The Legend of Halladay and His Adams″ by John Falk; ′The American Fly Fisher′, Vol 42 No 4. Manchester, Vermont : American Museum of Fly Fishing, (c2016), 

 
Dry fly patterns